Football in Stockholm organises about 60,000 players and is governed by Stockholm Football Association since 1917. Stockholm has several of Sweden's leading football clubs, and the city is home to 39 teams in the national league system and more than 100 amateur leagues regulated by the Stockholm Football Association. At the moment there are three Stockholm teams in the first-tier Allsvenskan, four in the second-tier Superettan, four in the third-tier Division 1.

Stockholm's most successful team is AIK, with twelve national championship golds and eight cup golds. Djurgårdens IF has twelve national championship golds and five cup golds. Hammarby IF has one national championship gold, which was won in 2001. AIK played their first national championship final in 1898 Svenska Mästerskapet.

Friends Arena in Solna, is the national stadium of Sweden national football team and the largest stadium in Sweden. It is also home ground to AIK. Tele2 Arena is the home ground for both Hammarby IF and Djurgårdens IF since 2013. 
The old ground of AIK was called Råsunda Stadium and was active up until 2012. Djurgårdens IF played at the Stockholm Olympic Stadium until 2013 and Hammarby IF had their home games at Söderstadion until 2013.

History

AIK started a football department in 1896 and played in the 1898 Svenska Mästerskapet final, which they lost to Örgryte IS of Gothenburg. In 1899, AIK played Djurgårdens IF, in their first match, which ended 2–1 to AIK on Ladugårdsgärdet. Their rivalry later became Tvillingderbyt (The Twin derby).

Football in Stockholm was early organised into leagues and in the 1902 season AIK, AIK II, Djurgårdens IF, IF Sleipner, IF Swithiod, Norrmalms SK, and Östermalms SK played in the Svenska Bollspelsförbundets första serie that Djurgården won.

In the 1924–25 season, AIK and Hammarby IF participated in the first Allsvenskan. Later also Westermalms IF (debut in 1926–27), Djurgårdens IF (debut in 1927–28), Reymersholms IK (debut in 1941–42) and IF Brommapojkarna (debut in 2007) have participated in Allsvenskan.

In 2001, three Stockholm teams ended top-three in Swedish top-tier Allsvenskan, Hammarby IF won, Djurgårdens IF Fotboll finished second and AIK finished third.

Teams

Most successful teams

Notes

References

 
Sport in Stockholm